Alena Michaela Buyx (born 29 September 1977) is a German medical ethicist. She has been president of the German Ethics Council since 2020.

Career
Buyx studied medicine, philosophy and sociology at the University of Münster, the University of York and the University College London from 1997, and earned a PhD. From 2009 to 2012 she served as an associate director of the Nuffield Council on Bioethics. She completed her habilitation in Münster in 2013. From 2012 to 2014 she headed the DFG-Emmy Noether group "Bioethics and Political Philosophy" at the University of Münster and was a senior research fellow in public policy at the University College London until 2015.

Buyx became professor of medical ethics at the University of Kiel in 2014. In 2016, she was appointed as a member of the German Ethics Council and became its president in 2020. In 2018, she became professor of ethics in medicine and health technologies at the Technical University of Munich. In 2020, she was elected as a member of the German National Academy of Sciences Leopoldina.

Other activities 
 Free University of Berlin, Member of the Board of Trustees
 Max Planck Institute for Biological Intelligence, Member of the Board of Trustees
 Robert Koch Institute (RKI), Member of the Scientific Advisory Board
 World Health Organization (WHO), Member of the Expert Advisory Committee on Developing Global Standards for Governance and Oversight of Human Genome Editing (2019-2021)

Selected publications 
 A. Fiske, P. Henningsen, A. Buyx: Your robot therapist will see you now: Ethical implications of embodied artificial intelligence in psychiatry, psychology, and psychotherapy. Journal of Medical Internet Research. 21(5), 2019, S. e13216, doi:10.2196/13216.
 A. Sierawska, A. Buyx: Unmet Needs in Children with ADHD - Can tDCS Fill the Gap? Promises and Ethical Challenges. Frontiers in Psychiatry. 2019. doi:10.3389/fpsyt.2019.00334.
 G. Richter, C. Borzikowsky, W. Lieb, S. Schreiber, M. Krawczak, A. Buyx: Patient views on research use of clinical data without consent: Legal, but also acceptable? European Journal of Human Genetics. 2019. doi:10.1038/s41431-019-0340-6.
 B. Prainsack, A. Buyx: The value of work and labour: Addressing the Future of Work (FOW) through the lens of solidarity. Bioethics. 32(9), 2018, pp. 585–592. doi:10.1111/bioe.12507.
 A. Fiske, A. Buyx, B. Prainsack: Health Information Counselors: A New Profession for the Age of Big Data? Academic Medicine. 2018. doi:10.1097/ACM.0000000000002395. PMID 30095453.
 G. Richter, M. Krawczak, W. Lieb, L. Wolff, S. Schreiber, A. Buyx: Broad consent for healthcare-embedded biobanking: understanding and reasons to donate in a large patient sample. Genetics in Medicine. 20(1), 2018, pp. 76–82. doi:10.1038/gim.2017.82. PMID 28640237.
 J. Littmann, A. Rid, A. Buyx: Tackling anti-microbial resistance. Ethical framework for rational antibiotic use. European Journal of Public Health.  28(2), 2018, pp. 359–363. doi:10.1093/eurpub/ckx165.
 B. Prainsack, A. Buyx: Solidarity in biomedicine and beyond. Cambridge University Press, 2017.
 B. Prainsack, A. Buyx: Solidarity: Reflections on an emerging concept in bioethics. 2011.

References 

Academic staff of the Technical University of Munich
Academic staff of the University of Kiel
20th-century German physicians
Members of the German Academy of Sciences Leopoldina
1977 births
Living people
University of Münster alumni
Alumni of the University of York
Alumni of University College London
Bioethicists
Medical ethicists